Jean Paul Guhel (died 1988) is a French ice dancer. With his wife Christiane Guhel, he was the 1962 European champion, 1962 World silver medalist, and 1960 World bronze medalist.

Results

Ice Dance
(with Christiane Duvois)

(with Fanny Besson)

(with Christiane Guhel)

References

 

French male ice dancers
Year of birth missing
World Figure Skating Championships medalists
European Figure Skating Championships medalists
1988 deaths